Ellescus scanicus is a species of true weevil in the beetle family Curculionidae. It is found in North America and Europe.

References

Further reading

External links

 

Curculioninae
Articles created by Qbugbot
Beetles described in 1792